Ștefan Surdul (? – 2 February 1595) was the son of Ioan Vodă cel Cumplit. He ruled Wallachia from May 1591 to August 1592. According to one source he was a leather cutter and harness maker by trade.

References

 

Rulers of Wallachia
History of Wallachia (1512–1714)
Year of birth unknown
Year of death unknown
16th-century rulers in Europe